Rafael Arrillaga Torrens (1913–1960) was a Puerto Rican politician and medical doctor.

He was born in Añasco, Puerto Rico on April 16, 1913. He attended primary and secondary school in his hometown and in Mayaguez. He earned a B.A. in mathematics and physics from the College of William & Mary, in Williamsburg, Virginia in 1932, and obtained his PhD degree in medicine from the Yale School of Medicine in 1936.

Torrens returned to Puerto Rico and settled in San Juan to a start his private practice in cardiology and simultaneously started a political career. In 1940 Torrens elected to the House of Representatives of Puerto Rico in the Manatí district and in 1943 was elected Speaker of the Puerto Rico House of Representatives and served until 1944. He was affiliated with the Independence party of Puerto Rico.

Torrens retired from politics and returned to medicine at the Professional Hospital in Santurce and worked as the director of the Center for Advanced Studies of Puerto Rico and the Caribbean.

Works
Torrens authored a number of books, many on philosophical thought, which were published in Madrid, Argentina and Mexico:
 (1963), for which he received a prize from the Institute of Puerto Rican Literature 
 (1973)
 (1976) 
 (1977)
 (1979), which he wrote in German and later translated to and published in Spanish
 (1982) 
 (1989)
 (1987) 


References

1913 births
1960 deaths
College of William & Mary alumni
People from Añasco, Puerto Rico
Puerto Rican cardiologists
Speakers of the House of Representatives of Puerto Rico
University of Puerto Rico faculty
Yale School of Medicine alumni